Homalattus is a genus of the spider family Salticidae (jumping spiders).

Species
As of May 2017, the World Spider Catalog lists the following species in the genus:
 Homalattus coriaceus Simon, 1902 — Sierra Leone, South Africa
 Homalattus marshalli Peckham & Peckham, 1903 — South Africa
 Homalattus obscurus Peckham & Peckham, 1903 — South Africa
 Homalattus punctatus Peckham & Peckham, 1903 — South Africa
 Homalattus pustulatus (White, 1841) — Sierra Leone
 Homalattus similis Peckham & Peckham, 1903 — South Africa

References

Salticidae
Spiders of Africa
Salticidae genera